Initiative for the Development of Soria (IDES) was a Sorian regionalist political party founded in 2002, mainly by ex-members of the provincial branch of the Spanish Socialist Workers' Party (PSOE). The party merged with Citizens (C's) in 2015.

Election results

Local councils

References

Political parties in Castile and León
Regionalist parties in Spain
Political parties established in 2002
2002 establishments in Spain